The Quaker Universalist Fellowship  is a religious organization serving predominantly individuals with an ongoing association with the Religious Society of Friends (Quakers), a universalist understanding of Quaker teachings and traditions, and a commitment to religious pluralism. It has published books and periodicals from Landenberg, Pennsylvania since the 1980s.

It calls itself 
 an informal gathering of persons who cherish the spirit of universality that has always been intrinsic to the Quaker faith
and says that its mission is
 to foster the understanding that within everyone is a directly accessible spiritual light that can lead people to equality, simplicity, justice, compassion and peace.

Somewhat different from the way the term Universalism is typically understood in Christian theology, Quaker universalism focuses on the “belief that there is a spirit of universal love in every person, and that a compassion-centered life is therefore available to people of all faiths and backgrounds.”

Publications 
 Margery Post Abbott, Lanny Jay, W. Norman Cooper, Waiting and resting in the true silence
 David Boulton, Militant seedbeds of early Quakerism : two essays
 Samuel D. Caldwell, That blessed principle : reflections on the uniqueness of Quaker universalism, 1988
 Avery Dulles, Revelation and the religions
 Rhoda R. Gilman, The universality of unknowing : Luther Askeland and the wordless way, 2007
 Douglas Gwyn, The Quaker dynamic : personal faith and corporate vision
 Gene Knudsen-Hoffman, Kingdon W. Swayne, Spirit and trauma : a universalist world view as an instrument of healing
 Margery Larrabee, There is a hunger : mutual spiritual friendship, 1994
 Carol P. MacCormack, Jack Mongar, Hildegard of Bingen, a 12th century holistic world view
 Anthony G Manousos, Islam from a Quaker perspective, 2002
 A. Ernest Morgan, Should Quakers receive the Good Samaritan into their membership?, 1998
 John Nicholson (Quaker writer), The place of prayer is a precious habitation, 1994
 David Rush, They too are Quakers : a survey of 199 nontheist Friends
 Daniel A. Seeger
 Quaker universalists : their ministry among Friends and in the world, 1989
 The boundaries of our faith : a reflection on the practice of goddess spirituality in New York Yearly Meeting, from the perspective of a Universalist Friend, 1991
 I have called you friends (John 15:15), 1997
 The mystical path : pilgrimage to the one who is always here, 2004
 Michael Anthony Sells, The generous Qurʼan : ten selected suras
 Mulford Quickert Sibley
 and Rhoda Gilman, Authority and mysticism in Quaker and Buddhist thought : essays
 In praise of Gandhi : technology and the ordering of human relations, 2005
 Kingdon W Swayne, Universalism and me
 Elizabeth G. Watson, Journey to universalism
 Patricia A. Williams
 Hazardous engagement : God makes a Friend, 2006
 Universalism and religions, 2007

References 

Quaker organizations based in the United States
Book publishing companies based in Pennsylvania
Christian groups with universalist beliefs
Religious organizations established in the 1980s
Publishing companies established in the 1980s